In this list, roads names are used in different areas and the features of the roads varies.  So this table address the differences in that usage when needed.

Notes 
Access type
Interchange - access limited to grade-separated interchanges
Junction (roundabout) - access limited to major roads via a roundabout
Partial - Limited access
Uncontrolled - no control of access
Speed
Any - Used in all types of applications
Low - Low-speed
High - High-Speed
Cross traffic
Yes- cross traffic allowed at-grade without a traffic light
Intersections - at-grade with a traffic signal
No - no cross traffic
Divided
Yes
No
Some - some sections may be divided

References 

 
Urban studies and planning terminology
Types
Roads